Pinuccio Sciola (15 March 1942 – 13 May 2016) was an Italian sculptor and muralist from San Sperate, Sardinia.  His work has been mentioned as a major attraction of the nearby town of Assemini.  His work has also been exhibited in Alghero.

Forms in which he worked include pietre sonore or "sounding stones": large sculptures (mainly limestones or basalts) that resonate when rubbed by human hands or small rocks.

References

1942 births
2016 deaths
Italian muralists
Italian male painters
Italian male sculptors
20th-century Italian painters
20th-century Italian sculptors
20th-century Italian male artists
21st-century Italian painters
21st-century Italian sculptors
People from the Province of Cagliari
Italian contemporary artists
21st-century Italian male artists